Mihaela Andreea Mihai (born 15 December 2004) is a Romanian handball player who plays as a right wing for CSM București and the Romania national team.

References
 

2004 births
Living people 
Romanian female handball players